Košarkarski klub Rogaška, commonly referred to as KK Rogaška or simply Rogaška, is basketball team from Rogaška Slatina, Slovenia, playing in the Slovenian top division.

History
The first basketball club in Rogaška Slatina was founded in the early 1960s. After Slovenia's independence, the team played in the top division and FIBA Korać Cup. In 1997, the club abolished senior team due to financial problems and competed only in youth competitions, before in February 1998 the club was re-founded as KK Rogaška 98. Rogaška earned promotion to the top division in 2011. In the 2014–15 and 2016–17 seasons, Rogaška reached the championship finals, where they lost 3–1 on both occasions, to Tajfun and Union Olimpija, respectively.

Players

Current roster

References

External links
 

Basketball teams in Slovenia
Basketball teams established in 1998
1998 establishments in Slovenia